50 Let Pobedy ("50 Years of Victory", referring to the anniversary of victory of the Soviet Union in World War II) is a Russian  nuclear-powered icebreaker.

History
Construction on project no. 10521 started on 4 October 1989, at the Baltic Works in Leningrad (now Saint Petersburg), USSR. Originally the ship was named Ural. Work was halted in 1994 for lack of funds, so that the actual fiftieth anniversary of Victory Day in 1995, after which she was named, found the ship in an abandoned state. Construction was restarted in 2003.

On 30 November 2004, a fire broke out on the ship. All workers aboard the vessel had to be evacuated while the fire crews battled the fire for some 20 hours before getting it under control; one worker was sent to the hospital.

She was finally completed in the beginning of 2007, after the 60th Anniversary. The icebreaker sailed into the Gulf of Finland for two weeks of sea trials on 1 February 2007. Upon completing sea trials, the icebreaker returned to St. Petersburg Baltic shipyard and started preparations for her maiden voyage to Murmansk.

She arrived at her homeport Murmansk on 11 April 2007.

The icebreaker is an upgrade of the Arktika class. She has a crew of 140.

50 Let Pobedy is also an experimental project; for the first time in the history of Russian icebreakers the design incorporated a spoon-shaped bow. As predicted by the ship's designers, such a shape increases the efficiency of the ship's efforts in breaking the ice. The icebreaker is equipped with an all-new digital automated control system. The biological shielding complex was heavily modernized and re-certified by the State Commission. A new ecological compartment was created.

The ship has an athletic/exercise facility, a swimming pool, a library, a restaurant, a massage facility, and a music salon at the crew's disposal.

Arctic tourism
Since 1989 the nuclear-powered icebreakers have also been used for tourist purposes carrying passengers to the North Pole. Each participant pays up to US$45,000 for a cruise lasting two weeks. The Fiftieth Anniversary of Victory contains an accommodation deck customised for tourists.

Quark Expeditions chartered 50 Let Pobedy (which they refer to as 50 Years of Victory) for expeditions to the North Pole in 2008. The ship carried 128 guests in 64 cabins in five categories. 

As of February 2013, Quark Expeditions as well as international polar cruise company Poseidon Expeditions were both offering North Pole cruises on 50 Let Pobedy. On 30 July 2013 50 Let Pobedy reached the North Pole for the 100th time in the history of icebreaker navigation during one of Poseidon Expeditions cruises.

In October 2013, the vessel carried the Olympic Flame to the North Pole, in the runup to the 2014 Winter Olympics

In August 2017, the vessel set a new record for transit time to the North Pole, making the journey from Murmansk to the Pole in 79 hours, arriving at 02:33 AM on 17 August 2017.

References

External links
 50 Years of Victory Ship Details from Quark Expeditions with detailed deck plans
 Page dedicated to 50 Years of Victory on a website of Poseidon Expeditions  containing numerous photos, description, deckplan and panoramas of cabins.
 
 
 
 Current location on satellite tracking website vesselfinder.com.
 Video of 50 Let Pebedy escorting LNG carrier Christophe de Margerie from China to the north Russian port of Sabetta on the Northern Sea Route. Sovcomflot video via The Siberian Times, 17 February 2021.

Nuclear-powered icebreakers
Icebreakers of Russia
1993 ships
Ships built at the Baltic Shipyard